"Midnight'" is a 1952 single recorded by Red Foley, written by Boudleaux Bryant and Chet Atkins. "Midnight" was Red Foley's ninth number one on the Country & Western charts, spending one week at number one and a total of eleven weeks on the chart.

Hank Williams, on his final road trip the day before he died, sang an a cappella "Midnight" in the passenger seat. According to his driver, Charles Carr, it was the last song he remembers Hank singing.

Remake versions  
Porter Wagoner (1956)
Don Gibson (1959)
Kathy Linden (1960) This version was a regional hit in many parts of the US. 
Ray Charles (1962) 
Floyd Cramer (1963) 
Wanda Jackson (1964) 
Chet Atkins (1969)
Chet Atkins & Suzy Bogguss (1992)

References
 
 

1953 songs
Songs written by Felice and Boudleaux Bryant
Songs written by Chet Atkins
Red Foley songs
Kathy Linden songs